The ARIA Albums Chart ranks the best-performing albums and extended plays (EPs) in Australia. Its data, published by the Australian Recording Industry Association, is based collectively on the weekly physical and digital sales of albums and EPs. In 2019, 27 albums claimed the top spot; the soundtrack for the 2018 film Bohemian Rhapsody by Queen was the first number one of the year. Five acts, Dean Lewis, Billie Eilish, BTS, Conrad Sewell and Luke Combs, reached the top spot for the first time.

Chart history

Number-one artists

See also
2019 in music
List of number-one singles of 2019 (Australia)

References

2019
Australia albums
Number-one albums